Rafael Ramón Conde Alfonzo (13 July 1943 – 10 December 2020) was a Venezuelan Roman Catholic bishop.

Conde Alfonzo was born in Venezuela and ordained to the priesthood in 1968. He served as titular bishop of Bapara and as auxiliary bishop of the Roman Catholic Archdiocese of Caracas from 1995 to 1997 and as coadjutor bishop of the Roman Catholic Diocese of La Guaira from 1997 to 1999. He then served as bishop of the Roman Catholic Diocese of Margarita from 1999 to 2008 and as bishop of the Roman Catholic Diocese of Maracay from 2008 to 2009.

He died at the age of 77 on 10 December 2020 after suffering from Pancreatic cancer.

Notes

External links

1943 births
2020 deaths
Venezuelan Roman Catholic bishops
Deaths from cancer in Venezuela
Deaths from pancreatic cancer
Roman Catholic bishops of Margarita
Roman Catholic bishops of Maracay
Roman Catholic bishops of La Guaira
Roman Catholic bishops of Caracas